Déjà Vu Parker is a radio personality and motivational speaker born and raised in Jacksonville, Florida. She was born July 23, but the year is unknown. She is a co-host of "The Quake's House Afternoon Show” for 107.5 WBLS radio station. She is also the current announcer on  'Live with Kelly and Ryan' .

Career
Déjà began her career as an assistant Program and Music Director in her hometown of Jacksonville, Florida. In 1999, Déjà worked as the midday host, Program Director and Music Director at 100.3 The Beat. She continued her career as she moved to New York and joined Power 105.1 as a midday personality, where she remained for eight years.

Déjà currently hosts the "Quake’s House Afternoon Show" at WBLS, which was purchased by Emmis Communications in February 2014. Déjà is the co-host of "Quake’s House Afternoon Show" which features WBLS personality Earthquake (comedian). "Quake’s House Afternoon Show" runs Monday to Friday from 3pm to 7pm. Both hosts combine comedy, their love for New York and the popular sounds of R&B.

In addition to co-hosting WBLS, Déjà is also an on-air personality for Sirius XM station "The Heat", Saturdays from 10am to 1pm, where she plays popular R&B and Hip-Hop hits in addition to interviewing numerous celebrities. Déjà also is the co-host of The Heat's Countdown The HOTNESS every Saturday from 1pm to 4pm as she plays new music and throwbacks 

Déjà is currently the announcer of Live with Kelly and Ryan.

Community service
Déjà Vu is involved in community service throughout the tri-state area through her own non-profit organization, The Flava Unit Teen Community Group. This program works with high school students throughout the five New York boroughs to complete two services projects each month.  Déjà Vu has made it a point to bring The Flava Unit to each radio market she has worked for.

References

Living people
Year of birth missing (living people)
People from Jacksonville, Florida
American radio personalities
American motivational speakers